Yeo Jin-goo (born August 13, 1997) is a South Korean actor. Yeo began his career as child actor, debuting in the film Sad Movie (2005). Nicknamed "Nation's Little Brother", he went on to play the younger version of the lead roles in movies and television dramas such as A Frozen Flower (2008), Giant (2010), Moon Embracing the Sun (2012), and Missing You (2012). He is known for playing the title character in action thriller Hwayi: A Monster Boy (2013), for which he won Best New Actor at the Blue Dragon Film Awards.

Since then, he has taken on lead roles in the films Shoot Me in the Heart (2015), The Long Way Home (2015), and Warriors of the Dawn (2017). He has also starred in the dramas Orange Marmalade (2015), The Royal Gambler (2016), Circle (2017), Reunited Worlds (2017), The Crowned Clown (2019), My Absolute Boyfriend (2019), Hotel Del Luna (2019), and Beyond Evil (2021).

Film

Television series

Television shows

Web shows

Musical theater

Narration

Music video

References

South Korean filmographies
Male actor filmographies